Joseki is a sequence of standard moves in the game of Go.

Joseki may also refer to:

a sequence of standard moves in Shogi
JOSEKI, a pair of encryption algorithms used by the National Security Agency